Barry Butts In is a 1919 Australian film comedy from director Beaumont Smith starring British vaudevillian Barry Lupino, who was then visiting Australian. It is considered a lost film.

Plot
Barry (Barry Lupino), works in a grocery store in the country. He falls in love with a beautiful young girl (Agnes Dobson) in a touring pantomime show who is the granddaughter of Barry's uncle, a wealthy man who years ago disowned the girl's mother because she married an actor. The old man requests his nephews come to Sydney so he can choose an heir. Barry's cousins try to humiliate him but he manages to triumph and inherit his uncle's fortune, and marry the girl.

Cast
Barry Lupino as Barry
John Cosgrove
Agnes Dobson

Production
Barry Lupino was uncle of Ida Lupino and the film incorporated many of his routines.

Charles Villiers was assistant director.

Release
When the film was released a competition was held for naming the movie. The gimmick helped the movie become a success at the box office.

References

External links
Barry Butts In in the Internet Movie Database
Barry Butts In at National Film and Sound Archive

1919 films
Films directed by Beaumont Smith
Australian black-and-white films
Lost Australian films
Australian silent feature films
Australian comedy films
1919 comedy films
1919 lost films
Lost comedy films
Silent comedy films